Astrebla lappacea, commonly known as curly Mitchell grass, is a herb of the family Poaceae from the order Poales. The most common of the Astrebla species, a widespread Australian inland plant. Named in honour of Thomas Mitchell. Often seen on floodplains and heavy self mulching clay soils, growing to 0.9 metres tall. Flowering is in response to rain or flooding. This grass is palatable to livestock, even when dry. The Latin specific epithet of lappacea is derived from lappa meaning with burrs.

References

Chloridoideae
Flora of Australia
Plants described in 1915